Marina Gonçalves is a Portuguese politician who is serving as Minister of Infrastructure and Housing in XXIII Constitutional Government of Portugal and served as member of Assembly of the Republic from Viana do Castelo. She is the youngest minister in history of Politics of Portugal.

Personal life 
She was born on April 23, 1988 in Caminha.

References 

1988 births
Living people

21st-century Portuguese women politicians
Women government ministers of Portugal